Live: Word Up is the second live album by funk group Cameo, released  in 1998. Only two years since their last live release, Nasty, this album contains the same songs, minus three and is generally considered uninspired, which is echoed by the sparse packaging.

Track listing
 "Shake Your Pants" – 4:36 - Blackmon
 "Skin I'm In" – 4:58 - Blackmon
 "Nasty" – 3:45 - Blackmon
 "Why Have I Lost You" – 6:04 - Blackmon
 "Word Up!" – 6:35 - Blackmon, Jenkins
 "Candy" – 4:45 - Blackmon, Jenkins
 "She's Strange" – 2:42 - Blackmon, Jenkins, Leftenant, Singleton
 "Sparkle" – 4:27 - Blackmon, Lockett
 "Back and Forth" – 5:55 - Blackmon, Jenkins, Kendrick, Leftenant
 "I Just Want to Be" – 1:39 - Blackmon, Johnson

References

Cameo (band) albums
1998 live albums